Juan Francia (20 March 1897 – 2 October 1962) was an Argentine footballer, who played as centre forward and left winger. Due to his slim body and great agility, he eventually received the nickname Mono ("Monkey"). Francia's career include tenures on the most renowned clubs of Rosario, such as Tiro Federal, Newell's Old Boys, Rosario Central, and Provincial. He 6 titles with Rosario Central and 3 with Newell's Old Boys.

In international football, Francia played eight matches for the Argentina national football team from 1918 to 1922. He was also part of Argentina's squad for the 1922 South American Championship, being the top scorer of the tournament.

Biography 

His beginnings in football found him playing at an early age for Rosarian Club Belgrano, but he was forced to leave the team due to his short age. Francia then moved to Gimnasia y Esgrima which he joined in 1915. The following year he moved to the recently founded Rosario and Puerto Belgrano, playing the Santiago Pinasco Cup, second division of the Liga Rosarina de Football.

In 1917 he joined Tiro Federal, where he was part of the team that promoted to Rosario's Primera División. His good performances attracted the interest of Newell's Old Boys, which he joined in 1918. With Newell's, Francia won the Copa Nicasio Vila (Liga Rosarina's first division) that same year.

After his tenure on Newell's, Francia returned to Tiro Federal, but in the middle of the championship, a new schism happened in Rosarian football when one of dissident teams, Rosario Central, added Francia to its roster. With the Arroyito team, Francia won his first national title, the Copa de Competencia (Asociación Amateurs) in 1920 after beating Sportivo Almagro 2–0 at GEBA Stadium. Rosario Central also won the 1920 and 1920 Asociación Rosarina de Football championships (dissident competition). When the club returned to Liga Rosarina, they won two competitions else in 1922 and 1923.

After a brief period in Gimnasia y Esgrima de Santa Fe, Francia returned to Newell's in 1925, staying there five years until he joined Rosario Central in 1930. Francia finished his career in Club Atlético Provincial in 1931. 

Apart from his football career, Francia worked at the Sunchales station of Central Argentine Railway.

Titles

National 
Rosario Central
 Copa de Competencia (AAmF) (1): 1920

Regional 
Newell's Old Boys
 Copa Nicasio Vila (2): 1918, 1929
 Copa Estímulo (1): 1925
Rosario Central
 Asociación Amateurs Rosarina de Football (2): 1920, 1921
 Copa Estímulo (1): 1922
 Copa Nicasio Vila (2): 1923, 1930

National team 
Argentina
 Copa América (1): 1922

In his own words

References

External links
 

1897 births
1962 deaths
Argentine footballers
Argentina international footballers
Place of birth missing
Association football forwards